Ben Avon is a mountain in Scotland.

The name may also refer to:

 Ben Avon, Pennsylvania, United States, a borough
 Ben Avon Heights, Pennsylvania, United States, a borough
 Ben Avon, South Carolina, United States, a census-designated place